Lahana is a surname. Notable people with the surname include: 

Cyril Lahana, South African lawn bowler
Emma Lahana (born  1984), New Zealand actress